Margaret Ruth Mulholland is professor at Old Dominion University known for her work on nutrients in marine and estuarine environments.

Education and career 
Mulholland has a B.S. from the University of Notre Dame (1984), and an M.S. in biological oceanography (1986) and an M.M. in marine affairs (1992) from the University of Washington. In 1998 she earned her Ph.D. in biological oceanography from the University of Maryland. As of 2022 she is a professor at Old Dominion University.

Research 
Mulholland's early research examined the oxidation of amino acids and nitrogen cycling by the marine bacterium Trichodesmium. Her subsequent work investigated nitrogen cycling in harmful algae including Aureococcus and Karenia brevis. She has examined how phytoplankton will respond to an ocean enriched in carbon dioxide, the impact of climate change on the Chesapeake Bay, and the contribution of nitrogen-fixing organisms to nutrient cycling. Her research tracks organic compounds in seawater, for example cyanate or compounds produced by phytoplankton.  In coastal environments she has researched the impact of coastal flooding and the movement of pollution during floods. As of 2022 she has an h-index of 46 and has publications that have been cited more than 7000 times.

Selected publications

References

External links 

 

Living people
Women climatologists
University of Notre Dame alumni
University of Washington alumni
University of Maryland, College Park alumni
Old Dominion University faculty
Women oceanographers
Women chemists
Year of birth missing (living people)